The Pulitzer Prize for General Nonfiction is one of the seven American Pulitzer Prizes that are awarded annually for the "Letters, Drama, and Music" category. The award is given to a nonfiction book written by an American author and published during the preceding calendar year that is ineligible for any other Pulitzer Prize. The Prize has been awarded since 1962; beginning in 1980, one to three finalists have been announced alongside the winner.

Recipients
 An additional one to three finalists have been announced alongside the winner beginning in 1980. Two authors have won multiple prizes: Barbara W. Tuchman in 1963 and 1972, and Edward O. Wilson in 1979 and 1991. Additionally, two authors have been finalists multiple times: Steven Pinker (1998, 2003) and John McPhee (1982, 1987, 1991); McPhee won the Prize in 1999. Three winning works were also finalists for the Pulitzer Prize for History: A Bright Shining Lie: John Paul Vann and America in Vietnam by Neil Sheehan (1989), Lincoln at Gettysburg: The Words That Remade America by Garry Wills (1993), and The End of the Myth: From the Frontier to the Border Wall in the Mind of America by Greg Grandin (2020).

See also

 Pulitzer Prize for Biography or Autobiography
 Pulitzer Prize for History

References

External links

 Pulitzer Prize for General Nonfiction official website

 
 
Awards established in 1962
American non-fiction literary awards
General Non-Fiction